This is a list of the various animated cartoons featuring Daffy Duck.

Daffy Duck shorts 1937−1968

1937 

Porky's Duck Hunt April 17, 1937 (LT, Tex Avery) - with Porky Pig

1938 
Daffy Duck & Egghead January 1, 1938 (MM, Avery) - Color 
What Price Porky February 26, 1938 (LT, Robert Clampett) - with Porky Pig
Porky & Daffy August 6, 1938 (LT, Clampett) - with Porky Pig
The Daffy Doc November 26, 1938 (LT, Clampett) - with Porky Pig
Daffy Duck in Hollywood December 12, 1938 (MM, Avery) - Color

1939 

Daffy Duck and the Dinosaur April 22, 1939 (MM, Chuck Jones) - Color
Scalp Trouble June 24, 1939 (LT, Clampett) - with Porky Pig
Wise Quacks August 5, 1939 (LT, Clampett) - with Porky Pig
Naughty Neighbors October 7, 1939 (LT, Clampett) a "Porky Pig" cartoon (cameo)

1940 

All cartoons co-star Porky Pig.

Porky's Last Stand January 6, 1940 (LT, Clampett)
You Ought to Be in Pictures May 18, 1940 (LT, Friz Freleng)

1941 

All cartoons co-star Porky Pig.

A Coy Decoy June 7, 1941 (LT, Clampett)
The Henpecked Duck August 30, 1941 (LT, Clampett)

1942 
Conrad the Sailor February 28, 1942 (MM, Jones) - Color - with Conrad the Cat 
Daffy's Southern Exposure May 2, 1942 (LT, Norman McCabe) - Final "little Daffy" cartoon
The Impatient Patient September 5, 1942 (LT, McCabe)
The Daffy Duckaroo October 24, 1942 (LT, McCabe)
My Favorite Duck December 5, 1942 (LT, Jones) (Reissued as MM) - Color -  with Porky Pig

1943 

To Duck or Not to Duck March 6, 1943 (LT, Jones) - Color - with Elmer Fudd. First Daffy/Elmer pairing.
The Wise Quacking Duck May 1, 1943 (LT, Clampett) - Color
Yankee Doodle Daffy June 5, 1943 (LT, Freleng) - Color - with Porky Pig
Porky Pig's Feat July 17, 1943 (LT, Frank Tashlin) - with "Porky Pig". Bugs Bunny marks first joint on-screen appearance with Daffy in B&W.
Scrap Happy Daffy August 21, 1943 (LT, Tashlin) - Last appearance in B&W
A Corny Concerto September 18, 1943 (MM, Clampett)
Daffy – The Commando November 20, 1943 (LT, Freleng) - Color

1944 

Tom Turk and Daffy February 12, 1944 (LT, Jones) - with Porky Pig
Tick Tock Tuckered April 8, 1944 (LT, Clampett) (Reissued as MM) - with Porky Pig
Duck Soup to Nuts May 27, 1944 (LT, Freleng) (Reissued as MM) - with Porky Pig
Slightly Daffy June 17, 1944 (MM, Freleng) - with Porky Pig; color remake of Scalp Trouble
Plane Daffy September 16, 1944 (LT, Tashlin)
The Stupid Cupid November 25, 1944 (LT, Tashlin) (Reissued as MM) - with Elmer Fudd.

1945 

Draftee Daffy January 27, 1945 (LT, Clampett)
Ain't That Ducky May 19, 1945 (LT, Freleng) (Reissued as MM)
Nasty Quacks December 1, 1945 (MM, Tashlin)

1946 

Book Revue January 5, 1946 (LT, Clampett)
Baby Bottleneck March 16, 1946 (LT, Clampett) - with Porky Pig.
Daffy Doodles April 6, 1946 (LT, Robert McKimson) (Reissued as MM)  - with Porky Pig.
Hollywood Daffy June 22, 1946 (MM, Freleng)
The Great Piggy Bank Robbery July 20, 1946 (LT, Clampett)

1947 

Birth of a Notion April 12, 1947 (LT, McKimson) (Reissued as MM)
Along Came Daffy June 4, 1947 (LT, Freleng) (Reissued as MM) - with Yosemite Sam & his brother Orville
A Pest in the House August 2, 1947 (MM, Jones) - with Elmer Fudd. 
Mexican Joyride November 29, 1947 (LT, Arthur Davis)

1948 

What Makes Daffy Duck February 14, 1948 (LT, Davis) -  with Elmer Fudd.
Daffy Duck Slept Here March 6, 1948 (MM, McKimson) - with Porky Pig.
The Up-Standing Sitter July 3, 1948 (LT, McKimson)
You Were Never Duckier August 7, 1948 (MM, Jones) - with Henery Hawk.
Daffy Dilly October 30, 1948 (MM, Jones)
The Stupor Salesman November 20, 1948 (LT, Davis)
Riff Raffy Daffy November 27, 1948 (LT, Davis) - with Porky Pig.

1949 

Wise Quackers January 1, 1949 (LT, Freleng) (Reissued as MM) - with Elmer Fudd.
Holiday for Drumsticks January 22, 1949 (MM, Davis)
Daffy Duck Hunt March 26, 1949 (LT, McKimson) (Reissued as MM) - with Porky Pig & Barnyard Dawg.

1950 

Boobs in the Woods January 28, 1950 (LT, McKimson) (Reissued as MM)  - with Porky Pig.
The Scarlet Pumpernickel March 4, 1950 (LT, Jones) (Reissued as MM)  - with Porky Pig, Elmer Fudd, Henery Hawk, Sylvester & Melissa Duck.
His Bitter Half May 20, 1950 (MM, Freleng)
Golden Yeggs August 5, 1950 (MM, Freleng) - with Porky Pig & Rocky. (First appearance of Rocky)
The Ducksters September 2, 1950 (LT, Jones) (Reissued as MM) - with Porky Pig.

1951 

Rabbit Fire May 19, 1951 (LT, Jones) (Reissued as MM) - Hunter's Trilogy: Part 1/3 - with Bugs Bunny & Elmer Fudd 
Drip-Along Daffy November 17, 1951 (MM, Jones) - with Porky Pig and Nasty Canasta. (First appearance of Nasty Canasta) 
The Prize Pest December 22, 1951 (LT, McKimson) (Reissued as MM) - with Porky Pig.

1952 

Thumb Fun March 1, 1952 (LT, McKimson) (Reissued as MM) - with Porky Pig.
Cracked Quack July 5, 1952 (MM, Freleng) - with Porky Pig.
Rabbit Seasoning September 20, 1952 (MM, Jones) - Hunter's Trilogy: Part 2/3 - with Bugs Bunny & Elmer Fudd.
The Super Snooper November 1, 1952 (LT, McKimson)
Fool Coverage December 13, 1952 (LT, McKimson) (Reissued as MM)  - with Porky Pig.

1953 

Duck Amuck February 28, 1953 (MM, Jones)
Muscle Tussle April 18, 1953 (MM, McKimson)
Duck Dodgers in the 24½th Century July 25, 1953 (MM, Jones) - with Porky Pig & Marvin the Martian. (First pairing of Daffy and Marvin)
Duck! Rabbit, Duck! October 3, 1953 (MM, Jones) - Hunter's Trilogy: Part 3/3 - with Bugs Bunny & Elmer Fudd.

1954 

Design for Leaving March 27, 1954 (LT, McKimson) (Reissued as MM) - with Elmer Fudd.
Quack Shot October 30, 1954 (MM, McKimson) - with Elmer Fudd.
My Little Duckaroo November 27, 1954 (MM, Jones) - with Porky Pig and Nasty Canasta.

1955

Beanstalk Bunny February 12, 1955 (MM, Jones) - with Bugs Bunny & Elmer Fudd.
Stork Naked February 26, 1955 (MM, Freleng)
Sahara Hare March 26, 1955 (LT, Freleng) - Starring Bugs Bunny. (cameo)
This Is a Life? July 9, 1955 (MM, Freleng) - with Bugs Bunny, Elmer Fudd, Yosemite Sam & Granny.
Dime to Retire September 3, 1955 (LT, McKimson) - with Porky Pig.

1956 

The High and the Flighty February 18, 1956 (MM, McKimson) - with Foghorn Leghorn & Barnyard Dawg.
Rocket Squad March 10, 1956 (MM, Jones) - with Porky Pig.
Stupor Duck July 7, 1956 (LT, McKimson)
A Star Is Bored September 15, 1956 (LT, Freleng) - with Bugs Bunny, Elmer Fudd & Yosemite Sam.
Deduce, You Say! September 29, 1956 (LT, Jones) - with Porky Pig.

1957 

Ali Baba Bunny February 9, 1957 (MM, Jones) - with Bugs Bunny
Boston Quackie June 22, 1957 (LT, McKimson) - with Porky Pig.
Ducking the Devil August 17, 1957 (MM, McKimson) - with Taz. (Only Daffy/Taz pairing)
Show Biz Bugs November 2, 1957 (LT, Freleng) - with Bugs Bunny.

1958 

Don't Axe Me January 4, 1958 (MM, McKimson) - with Elmer Fudd & Barnyard Dawg.
Robin Hood Daffy March 8, 1958 (MM, Jones) - with Porky Pig.

1959 

China Jones February 14, 1959 (LT, McKimson) - with Porky Pig.
Apes of Wrath April 18, 1959 (MM, Freleng) - Starring Bugs Bunny (cameo)
People Are Bunny December 19, 1959 (MM, McKimson) - with Bugs Bunny.

1960

Person To Bunny April 1, 1960 (MM, Freleng) - with Bugs Bunny & Elmer Fudd.

1961

The Abominable Snow Rabbit May 20, 1961 (LT, Jones) - with Bugs Bunny.
Daffy's Inn Trouble September 23, 1961 (LT, McKimson) - with Porky Pig.

1962

Quackodile Tears March 31, 1962 (MM, Davis)
Good Noose November 10, 1962 (LT, McKimson)

1963 

Fast Buck Duck March 9, 1963 (MM, McKimson)
The Million Hare April 6, 1963 (LT, McKimson) - with Bugs Bunny.
Aqua Duck September 28, 1963 (MM, McKimson)

1964 

The Iceman Ducketh May 16, 1964 (LT, Phil Monroe) - with Bugs Bunny.

1965 

It's Nice to Have a Mouse Around the House January 16, 1965 (LT, Freleng) - with Sylvester, Granny & Speedy Gonzales. (First Daffy/Speedy pairing)
Moby Duck March 27, 1965 (LT, McKimson) - with Speedy Gonzales.
Assault and Peppered April 24, 1965 (MM, McKimson) - with Speedy Gonzales.
Well Worn Daffy May 22, 1965 (LT, McKimson) - with Speedy Gonzales.
Suppressed Duck June 18, 1965 (LT, McKimson) - Final solo Daffy cartoon.
Corn on the Cop July 24, 1965 (MM, Irv Spector) - with Porky Pig & Granny.
Tease for Two August 28, 1965 (LT, McKimson) - with the Goofy Gophers. (Only Daffy/Goofy Gophers pairing)
Chili Corn Corny October 23, 1965 (LT, McKimson) - with Speedy Gonzales.
Go Go Amigo November 20, 1965 (MM, McKimson) - with Speedy Gonzales.

1966 

All 1966-1968 cartoons co-star Speedy Gonzales, and all 1966 cartoons are directed by Robert McKimson.

The Astroduck (or Astro Duck) January 1, 1966 (LT)
Mucho Locos February 5, 1966 (MM) Final Daffy/Porky(Cameo) pairing.
Mexican Mousepiece February 26, 1966 (MM)
Daffy Rents March 26, 1966 (LT)
A-Haunting we will Go April 16, 1966 (LT) - with Witch Hazel.
Snow Excuse May 21, 1966 (MM)
A Squeak in the Deep July 19, 1966 (LT)
Feather Finger August 20, 1966 (MM)
Swing Ding Amigo September 17, 1966 (LT)
A Taste of Catnip December 3, 1966 (MM) - with Sylvester (cameo).

1967 

Daffy's Diner January 21, 1967 (MM, McKimson)
Quacker Tracker April 29, 1967 (LT, Rudy Larriva)
The Music Mice-Tro May 27, 1967 (MM, Larriva)
The Spy Swatter June 24, 1967 (LT, Larriva)
Speedy Ghost to Town July 29, 1967 (MM, Alex Lovy)
Rodent to Stardom September 23, 1967 (LT, Lovy)
Go Away Stowaway September 30, 1967 (MM, Lovy) Last Daffy Merrie Melody until 1988
Fiesta Fiasco December 9, 1967 (LT, Lovy)

1968 

Skyscraper Caper March 9, 1968 (LT, Lovy)
See Ya Later Gladiator June 29, 1968 (LT, Lovy) - Final theatrical "Daffy Duck" cartoon until 1980.

Post-golden age media featuring Daffy Duck

1970 
Pat Paulsen's Half a Comedy Hour: Paulsen interviews Daffy (voiced by Mel Blanc) in the debut episode.

1972 

The ABC Saturday Superstar Movie: "Daffy Duck and Porky Pig Meet the Groovie Goolies" First TV production. Voiced by Mel Blanc.

1976 

 Bugs and Daffy's Carnival of the Animals.

1977 

Bugs Bunny's Easter Special
Bugs Bunny in Space

1978 

How Bugs Bunny Won the West
A Connecticut Rabbit in King Arthur's Court
Bugs Bunny's Howl-Oween Special

1979 

Bugs Bunny's Valentine
The Mother's Day Special
The Bugs Bunny/Road Runner Movie

1980 

The Yolk's on You (originally part of Daffy Duck's Easter Egg-Citement)
The Chocolate Chase (originally part of Daffy Duck's Easter Egg-Citement)
Daffy Flies North (originally part of Daffy Duck's Easter Egg-Citement)
Duck Dodgers and the Return of the 24½th Century - (edited  into Daffy Duck's Thanks-for-Giving Special)

1981 

The Looney Looney Looney Bugs Bunny Movie

1982 

Bugs Bunny's Mad World of Television
Bugs Bunny's 3rd Movie: 1001 Rabbit Tales

1983 

Daffy Duck's Fantastic Island

1987 

The Duxorcist (LT) - Starring Melissa, voiced by Mel Blanc.

1988 

Who Framed Roger Rabbit 
The Night of the Living Duck (MM) - singing voice by Mel Torme.
Daffy Duck's Quackbusters
Bugs vs. Daffy: Battle of the Music Video Stars

1989 

Bugs Bunny's Wild World of Sports - Final performance as Daffy by Mel Blanc.

1990 

Cartoon All-Stars to the Rescue - first time Daffy was voiced by Jeff Bergman.
Gremlins 2: The New Batch - voiced by Jeff Bergman.
Tiny Toon Adventures - voiced by Jeff Bergman, Joe Alaskey, and Greg Burson (several episodes between 1990 and 1995).
Happy Birthday, Bugs!: 50 Looney Years

1991 

Box-Office Bunny (LT) - Starring Bugs Bunny, voiced by Jeff Bergman.
(Blooper) Bunny (MM) - Starring Bugs Bunny, voiced by Jeff Bergman.
Taz-Mania - voiced by Maurice LaMarche (episode: Devil of a Job).
Bugs Bunny's Lunar Tunes - starring Bugs Bunny, voiced by Joe Alaskey.
 Bugs Bunny's Overtures to Disaster

1992 

Bugs Bunny's Creature Features - starring Bugs Bunny, voiced by Jeff Bergman.
Invasion of the Bunny Snatchers (LT) - starring Bugs Bunny, voiced by Jeff Bergman.
The Plucky Duck Show - voiced by Jeff Bergman (episode: Duck Trek).

1993 

Animaniacs - voiced by Greg Burson (1993–1997), and by Mel Blanc through archival footage in "Critical Condition". Appears in episodes "De-Zanitized", "Taming of the Screwy", H.M.S. Yakko", "Critical Condition", "Video Review", "The Warners' 65th Anniversary Special", "Back in Style"

1995 

Carrotblanca - voiced by Joe Alaskey.

1996 

Superior Duck (LT) - only time Daffy was voiced by Frank Gorshin.
Marvin the Martian in the Third Dimension (LT) - voiced by Joe Alaskey.
Space Jam - first time Daffy was voiced by Dee Bradley Baker. (later reprises his role in Wabbit./New Looney Tunes)

1998 

The Drew Carey Show - voiced by Joe Alaskey (episode: My Best Friend's Wedding).
Quest for Camelot Sing-A-Longs - voiced by Joe Alaskey.
Looney Tunes Sing-A-Longs - voiced by Joe Alaskey.

2000 

Tweety's High-Flying Adventure - voiced by Joe Alaskey.

2001 

Baby Looney Tunes - voiced by Samuel Vincent (2001–2006).

2003 

 Baby Looney Tunes: Eggs-traordinary Adventure (2003), voiced by Samuel Vincent.
Duck Dodgers - voiced by Joe Alaskey (2003–2005).
Looney Tunes: Back in Action - voiced by Joe Alaskey.
 Looney Tunes: Reality Check (2003), voiced by Joe Alaskey
 Looney Tunes: Stranger Than Fiction (2003), voiced by Joe Alaskey

2004 

Attack of the Drones (LT) - only time Daffy was voiced by Jeff Glen Bennett.
Daffy Duck for President - voiced by Joe Alaskey.

2006 
Porky and Daffy in the William Tell Overture
Bah, Humduck! A Looney Tunes Christmas - voiced by Joe Alaskey.

2011 

The Looney Tunes Show  - voiced by Jeff Bergman (2011–2014).

2012 

Daffy's Rhapsody (LT) - voiced by Mel Blanc (via archive audio).

2015 
Looney Tunes: Rabbits Run - voiced by Jeff Bergman.
Wabbit/New Looney Tunes - voiced by Dee Bradley Baker

2018 
Teen Titans Go! To the Movies - Cameo during the opening Warner Bros. Animation logo. Voiced by Eric Bauza.

2019 
Looney Tunes Cartoons - voiced by Eric Bauza.

2020 
Mortal Kombat Legends: Scorpion's Revenge - Cameo during the opening Warner Bros. Animation logo, where he is grabbed by Scorpion. Voiced by Eric Bauza.
Animaniacs (2020) - Appears in segments "Suspended Animation Part 2", "Suffragette City", "The Warners Are Present", and "Yakko Amakko". Voiced by Eric Bauza in "Yakko Amakko", no voice actor for other segments.

2021 
 Teen Titans Go! See Space Jam (2021), voiced by Dee Bradley Baker via archive footage from Space Jam
Space Jam: A New Legacy - voiced by Eric Bauza.

2022 
 Bugs Bunny Builders - voiced by Eric Bauza

See also 
 The Bugs Bunny Show (1960-2000)

References 

Daffy Duck